Hair Fashions was an early mechanical television series which aired in New York City during 1932. Featuring Ferdinand Graf, it was a 15-minute program about hair fashions which aired on W2XAB (now WCBS-TV). It was also listed as Society Hair Fashions in an early TV listing. It was likely one of the world's earliest fashion television series. In one TV listing, it is listed for Wednesday at 8:30PM, preceded by dancer Grace Voss and followed at 8:45PM by Senator Nutt and his Guffawians. (see section "Television programs for the week").

Nothing remains of the series today, as it aired live, and practical methods of recording live television did not exist until late 1947. The bottom of Page 19 of the July 2, 1932 edition of The New York Sun features a behinds-the-scenes picture of an episode.

References

External links
Hair Fashions on IMDb

1930s American television series
1932 American television series debuts
1932 American television series endings
American live television series
Lost television shows
Black-and-white American television shows
Fashion-themed television series